Roni Visnoveski Turola or simply Roni (born 7 July 1987 in Botucatu, is a Brazilian goalkeeper. He currently plays for Uberaba on loan from Santos.

Contract
Uberaba (Loan) 7 January 2008 to 30 June 2008
Santos 10 December 2005 to 30 June 2008

References

External links
zerozero.pt 
websoccerclub 

1987 births
Living people
Brazilian footballers
Santos FC players
Uberaba Sport Club players
Association football goalkeepers
Brazilian people of Polish descent
People from Botucatu